El Matadero may refer to:
 The Slaughter Yard (El matadero), a short story by Esteban Echeverría
 El Matadero (Fear the Walking Dead), an episode of the television series Fear the Walking Dead